Aliabad (also Romanized as ‘Alīābād; also known as ‘Alī Kūrī and Kalāteh-ye Ūrūj) is a village in Zeberkhan Rural District, Zeberkhan District, Nishapur County, Razavi Khorasan Province, Iran. At the 2006 census, its population was 48, in 19 families.

See also 

 List of cities, towns and villages in Razavi Khorasan Province

References 

Populated places in Nishapur County